The FIS Nordic Junior and U23 World Ski Championships 2018 took place in Kandersteg and Goms, Switzerland from 27 January to 4 February 2018.  This was the 41st Junior World Championships and the 13th Under-23 World Championships in nordic skiing.

Schedule
All times are local (UTC+1).

Cross-country

Nordic combined

Ski jumping

Medal summary

Junior events

Cross-country skiing

Nordic combined

Ski jumping

Under-23 events

Cross-country skiing

Medal table

References

External links
jwsc2018.ch

2018
2018 in cross-country skiing
2018 in ski jumping
Junior World Ski Championships
2018 in Swiss sport
2018 in youth sport
International sports competitions hosted by Switzerland
January 2018 sports events in Switzerland
February 2018 sports events in Switzerland